Ludwik Żychliński (born 1837 in Grand Duchy of Posen, d. after 1901 in Brusno, Lubaczów County) was a Polish patriotic activist, pułkownik (military officer), and diarist. Żychliński participated in Giuseppe Garibaldi's expedition of Sicily (1860). During the American Civil War, he fought by the Union side (1862–1863). He was a pułkownik at the January Uprising of 1863–1864.

Notable works
 Machiawell, jego życie i pewne wybitne strony, zawarte w jego dwóch głównych pismach historyczno-politycznych, 1861
Memoirs:
 Pamiętniki z wojny amerykańskiej 1862 r.
 Pamiętniki byłego dowódcy Dzieci Warszawy...
 Przygody Wielkopolanina w Azji i Ameryce...
 Wrażenia i przygody zesłanego w Sybir Wielkopolanina

References

External links
Extended biography 

January Uprising participants
Polish diarists
Union Army soldiers
1837 births
Year of death missing
Date of birth unknown
Polish people of the American Civil War